

2008-2009 roster

See also 
 Willie Sims (basketball)

EuroLeague team past rosters